Word of Mouth is a 1999 folk music album by Vin Garbutt.

Track listing
 City of Angels
 Forty Thieves
 Dark Side of the Moon
 John You Have Gone
 Tunes: Wilfy Mannion's Jig/The Wild Irishman/Jamie's Christening
 Sarajevo
 The Truth is Irresistible
 Waits and Weeps
 Beyond the Pale
 The Beggar's Bridge
 Time and Tide
 The Troubles of Erin

References 

1999 albums
Vin Garbutt albums